Joseph Perrin (28 February 1754 – 9 June 1800 in Genoa, Italy) was a French general of the Revolutionary Wars.

Career 
He became sergeant major in 1784, second lieutenant in 1790 and lieutenant in 1791; then he was appointed chef de bataillon on 31 December 1793. He was promoted to provisional brigade general on June 5, 1800, but he died on June 9 from a wound sustained during the Siege of Genoa in Italy.

Family life 
He was the son of Agathe Perrin (1724–1781). He first got married around 1780; then he married Catherine Heer (1763–1836) around 1800.

See also 

 List of French generals of the Revolutionary and Napoleonic Wars

Sources
 
 
 .

1754 births
1800 deaths
French generals
French Republican military leaders killed in the French Revolutionary Wars